Canyon Meadows is a residential neighbourhood in the southwest quadrant of Calgary, Alberta, Canada. It is bounded by Anderson Road to the north, Macleod Trail to the east, Fish Creek Provincial Park and Canyon Meadows Drive to the south and 14 Street W to the west. The Canyon Meadows golf course is developed northwest of the neighbourhood.

The community is served by the Canyon Meadows station of the C-Train LRT system.

Canyon Meadows was established in 1965. It is represented in the Calgary City Council by the Ward 13 councillor.

Demographics

Residents in this community had a median household income of $66,787 in 2000, and there were 10.6% low income residents living in the neighbourhood. As of 2000, 19.8% of the residents were immigrants. A proportion of 10.1% of the buildings were condominiums or apartments, and 17% of the housing was used for renting.

Education
The community is served by Canyon Meadows Elementary, Dr. E. P. Scarlett Senior High, Robert Warren Junior High public schools as well as St. Catherine Elementary (catholic).

See also
List of neighbourhoods in Calgary

References

External links
Canyon Meadows Community Association

Neighbourhoods in Calgary